Ilídio Fernando Torres do Vale (born 13 December 1957), known as Ilídio Vale, is a Portuguese football manager, currently serving as an assistant coach of the Portugal national team.

Early life
Vale was born in Maia. During his youth, Vale is a graduate of the University of Porto where he majored in Physical Education and Sports.

Coaching career
After starting as a manager with both Nogueirense junior and main team, Vale moved in 1989 to FC Porto, spending eighteen years in charge of its junior side.

In 1994, Vale was appointed Technical Coordinator around the youth football of FC Porto, being responsible for the development and operation of the project.

In the 1999-2000 season, Vale was appointed as assistant coach of the main squad. He also managed FC Porto B, the reserve team of Porto, between 2000 and 2004.

He left Porto in 2006 after winning 27 titles with the juniors squads.

Vale is in the Portuguese Football Federation since 2006.

On 8 May 2010, Vale qualified the Under-19s for the 2010 UEFA European Under-19 Championship in France.

On 23 March 2011, Ilídio Vale reached the 2009–11 International Challenge Trophy Final after Portugal U23 beat the Italy Lega Pro U21 3–2, overcoming a 0-2 defeat in the half-time.

He coached the Portugal under-20 side to the 2011 FIFA U-20 World Cup final.

Following Fernando Santos's appointment as head coach of the Portugal national team, Vale joined Santos's coaching team as an assistant coach.

Honours

Assistant coach
Porto
 Supertaça Cândido de Oliveira: 1999
 Taça de Portugal: 1999–2000

Portugal
 UEFA European Championship: 2016

Head coach
Portugal U19
La Manga Tournament: 2010

Portugal U20
FIFA U-20 World Cup: Runner-up 2011

Portugal U23
International Challenge Trophy: 2009–11

Managerial statistics

References

External links

1957 births
Living people
People from Maia, Portugal
Portuguese football managers
A.D. Nogueirense managers
University of Porto alumni
Sportspeople from Porto District
FC Porto B managers
FC Porto non-playing staff